Jodhi Meares (born 24 March 1971) is an Australian glamour model, television personality and fashion designer.

Career

Meares took her first steps into the spotlight when she was chosen as a model for Moove, a brand of flavoured milk. In 1992, she sang in the band Euphoria, for which she wrote the song "Karma". Meares later made her name as a glamour model, before establishing her own swimwear label Tigerlily Swimwear.

Meares is an occasional reporter for the Nine Network's travel show Getaway. She has also appeared three times on the Nine Network's clip show 20 to 1.

She was the host for FOX8's Australia's Next Top Model in 2007 and 2008, taking over from Erika Heynatz and joining the likes of international hosts Lisa Snowdon (UK) and creator Tyra Banks (US). In both of those seasons, the models have appeared in advertisements for Meares' former swimsuit line, Tigerlilly. Meares' tenure was not widely regarded; critics and fans of the show were shocked that a glamour model was to host a search for High Fashion models.

In 2013, Meares began activewear label, 'The Upside'.

Personal life
On 23 October 1999, Meares married billionaire Australian media businessman James Packer at Packer's home at Bellevue Hill, Sydney. They separated in June 2002.

References

External links

 Jodhi Meares: my best times, ninemsn.com.au
 
 Jodhi Meares Gallery

1971 births
Australian television personalities
Women television personalities
Glamour models
Living people
People from the South Coast (New South Wales)